Tingena levicula is a species of moth in the family Oecophoridae. It is endemic to New Zealand.

Taxonomy 
This species was first described by Alfred Philpott using specimens collected by Charles Edwin Clarke at Flat Mountain near Lake Manapouri at an altitude of about 4,000 ft in December. Philpott named Borkhausenia levicula. In 1939 George Hudson discussed and illustrated this species under the name B. levicula. In 1988 J. S. Dugdale placed this species in the genus Tingena. The male holotype specimen, collected at Flat Top Mountain, is held at the Auckland War Memorial Museum.

Description 
Philpott described this species as follows:

Distribution
This species is endemic to New Zealand and has been observed in Fiordland.

Behaviour 
The adults of this species are on the wing in December.

References

Oecophoridae
Moths of New Zealand
Moths described in 1930
Endemic fauna of New Zealand
Taxa named by Alfred Philpott
Endemic moths of New Zealand